Santa Cruz is represented in the Plurinational Legislative Assembly by four senators and their alternates elected through proportional representation. They serve five-year terms and qualify for reelection once. The current delegation is composed of two senators from Creemos and two senators from the Movement for Socialism: Centa Rek, Henry Montero, Soledad Flores, and Isidoro Quispe. Their respective alternates are: Erik Morón, Paola Fernández, William Torrez, and María Muñoz.

Even though the bicameral system was adopted in the 1831 Constitution and continued in subsequently promulgated constitutions, it can be affirmed that, with the exception of very small intervals, the Senate did not, in fact, exercise its functions until the convocation of the 1882 legislature. Furthermore, due to heavy political instability and frequent military interventions since 1882, Bolivia did not experience a continuous, uninterrupted, legislative session until 1982.

List of senators

References

Notes

Footnotes

Bibliography 

 
 

 
Santa Cruz